Situ Qiao (1902 – 16 February 1958) was a Chinese oil painter and graphic artist. An important member of the Lingnan School of art, he was also known for his friendship with the influential writer Lu Xun.  His most famous work is the 1940 painting Put Down Your Whip.

Biography

Situ Qiao was born to a poor family in Chikan, Kaiping, Guangdong province in 1902. His name at birth was Situ Qiaoxing. His father was an amateur painter.

In 1924 Situ entered the School of Theology of Yenching University in Beijing, but was more interested in painting. In 1926 he held his first personal exhibition, which was noticed by Lu Xun, who purchased his drawing Five Policemen and an O. When the Northern Expedition war erupted in 1927, he moved to Wuhan to work for the Soviet advisor Mikhail Borodin.

By 1928 he had moved to Shanghai and set up a studio. He held an exhibition in March 1928, which was again noticed by Lu Xun, who wrote about his conversation with Situ Qiao.  In winter 1928 Situ left for France to study painting, and exhibited at the Paris Salon the following year.

In 1930 Situ Qiao left France to study in New York City. He supported his studies by selling his own paintings. However, his activity was considered working, which was illegal for a holder of a student visa, and he was arrested. While being held in a prison for immigrants, he painted a painting entitled Painting the Statue of Liberty from the Most Unfree Place.

After being deported back to China, in 1931 he taught at Lingnan University in Guangzhou. In 1934 he went to Beijing, working as an art editor for Ta Kung Pao, and moved to Shanghai in 1936. Situ Qiao was present when Lu Xun died on 19 October 1936 in Shanghai, and drew the famous final sketches of the writer.

He soon moved to Nanking, then capital of China. When the invading Japanese army attacked Nanking in 1937, all his personal collection of paintings were destroyed.

Fleeing from the Sino-Japanese War, Situ Qiao left China for Rangoon, Burma, and later to Singapore. In 1940 he saw actor Jin Shan and actress Wang Ying's performance of Chen Liting's patriotic play Put Down Your Whip. He invited Jin Shan and Wang Ying to his studio, and painted his eponymous oil painting, which has become his most famous work.

When Singapore also fell to the Japanese in 1941, Situ Qiao escaped to the wartime Chinese capital Chungking.  After WWII, Situ Qiao went to New York City with his wife Feng Yimei in September 1946 to seek treatment for his lung disease. They returned to Beijing in 1950 after the founding of the People's Republic of China. He taught at the China Central Academy of Fine Arts and helped to set up the Museum of the Chinese Revolution.

On 16 February 1958 Situ Qiao died in his studio in Beijing. He donated all his paintings to the state, which are now in the collections of various museums in Beijing, Shanghai, Guangzhou, and his hometown Kaiping. A compilation of his paintings was published by Beijing People's Art Publishing House.

References

Further reading
Appreciating Situ Qiao's Paintings: Lu Xun's reflection on his conversation with Situ Qiao (1928). 
The Situ Qiao I Knew: writer Shen Congwen's memoir of Situ Qiao (1980). 
Situ Qiao: an Unfinished Painting: a biography by the painter's wife Feng Yimei, first published in Hong Kong in 1976. 

1902 births
1958 deaths
People from Kaiping
Republic of China painters
Painters from Guangdong
Academic staff of the Central Academy of Fine Arts
Academic staff of Lingnan University (Guangzhou)
Yenching University alumni
Chinese art educators
People deported from the United States
Chinese expatriates in France
Chinese expatriates in the United States
Educators from Guangdong
Singaporean people of Cantonese descent